In combinatorics, the Narayana numbers  form a triangular array of natural numbers, called the Narayana triangle, that occur in various counting problems. They are named after Canadian mathematician T. V. Narayana (1930–1987).

Formula 
The Narayana numbers can be expressed in terms of binomial coefficients:

Numerical values 
The first eight rows of the Narayana triangle read:

Combinatorial interpretations

Dyck words 

An example of a counting problem whose solution can be given in terms of the Narayana numbers , is the number of words containing  pairs of parentheses, which are correctly matched (known as Dyck words) and which contain  distinct nestings. For instance, since with four pairs of parentheses, six sequences can be created which each contain two occurrences the sub-pattern :

 (()(()))  ((()()))  ((())())
((()))  (())(())  ((()))()

From this example it should be obvious that , since the only way to get a single sub-pattern  is to have all the opening parentheses in the first  positions, followed by all the closing parentheses. Also , as  distinct nestings can be achieved only by the repetitive pattern .

More generally, it can be shown that the Narayana triangle is symmetric:

The sum of the rows in this triangle equal the Catalan numbers:

Monotonic lattice paths 

The following figures represent the Narayana numbers , illustrating the above mentioned symmetries.

This sum coincides with the interpretation of Catalan numbers as the number of monotonic paths along the edges of an  grid that do not pass above the diagonal.

Rooted trees 

This is analogous to the above examples:

 Each Dyck word can be represented as a rooted tree. We start with a single node – the root node. This is initially the active node. Reading the word from left to right, when the symbol is an opening parenthesis, add a child to the active a node and set this child as the active node. When the symbol is a closing parenthesis, set the parent of the active node as the active node. This way we obtain a tree, in which every non-root node corresponds to a matching pair of parentheses, and its children are the nodes corresponding to the successive Dyck words within these parentheses. Leaf nodes correspond to empty parentheses: . In analogous fashion, we can construct a Dyck word from a rooted tree via a depth-first search. Thus, there is an isomorphism between Dyck words and rooted trees.

 In the above figures of lattice paths, each upward edge from the horizontal line at height  to  corresponds to an edge between node  and its child. A node  has as many children, as there are upward edges leading from the horizontal line at height . To construct a rooted tree from a lattice path and vice versa, we can employ an algorithm similar to the one mentioned the previous paragraph. As with Dyck words, there is an isomorphism between lattice paths and rooted trees.

Partitions 

In the study of partitions, we see that in a set containing  elements, we may partition that set in  different ways, where  is the th Bell number. Furthermore, the number of ways to partition a set into exactly  blocks we use the Stirling numbers . Both of these concepts are a bit off-topic, but a necessary foundation for understanding the use of the Narayana numbers. In both of the above two notions crossing partitions are accounted for.

To reject the crossing partitions and count only the non-crossing partitions, we may use the Catalan numbers to count the non-crossing partitions of all  elements of the set, .  To count the non-crossing partitions in which the set is partitioned in exactly  blocks, we use the Narayana number .

Generating function 
The generating function for the Narayana numbers is

See also
 Catalan number
 Delannoy number
 Motzkin number
 Schröder number
 Pascal's triangle

Citations

References
 
 

Triangles of numbers
Integer sequences
Factorial and binomial topics
Permutations